Robert Mandell, professionally known as G Koop, is an American Grammy-nominated record producer, songwriter and musician.

Early life
G Koop is originally from Boston, Massachusetts. His father had a large collection of albums, and his mother contends that G Koop's first word was "doobie," interpreted as a request for The Doobie Brothers to be played. His first job was at a record store. As a young child, he learned to play a number of instruments, including guitar, bass, piano, and drums.

G Koop graduated from Berklee College of Music. While there, he studied music theory and performance. G Koop plays some of these instruments in his own studio while making his samples. Also while at Berklee, G Koop met Graham Richards and Anthony Caruso. The three have had an ongoing collaboration dubbed "G Koop and O-Man" since then.

Career
G Koop moved to California in 2002 and formed a jazz band, "The People's Quintet," with drummer Donald "Duck" Bailey. Unable to find work for the group, G Koop instead began working with music production software, such as Pro Tools and Reason.

He has been called a specialist in "replaying samples", in which an original sample is reinterpreted and recreated in the studio. The resulting track is a new interpretation that is no longer under the original's copyright, but it still retains the original's character. Producers can use the new work in their own songs without having to pay the fees required to sample the original track.

G Koop first produced for the Bay Area hip-hop group Foreign Legion. The group's MC, Prozack Turner, introduced him to producer Jake One, who in turn employed G Koop as a piano teacher. The two worked together on Jake's 2008 album, White Van Music, with G Koop performing instruments. He also worked on Jake's 2009 collaboration with Freeway, The Stimulus Package. The two also partnered together on Drake's "Furthest Thing" for his 2013 Nothing was the Same album. Jake One found the original sample for "Furthest Thing" from a 1990s live gospel album that Gene Brown, a record collector, recommended to him. However, the rights owners to the song requested high fees. Instead, Jake One asked G Koop to make an interpolation of the sample to avoid publishing issues. G Koop played all the instruments—guitar, piano, organ, drums, and bass—in his studio. The album's main producer, Noah "40" Shebib, recorded the vocals for the track with a choir in Toronto.

G Koop's first major placement as producer was Nelly's "Self Esteem" featuring Chuck D, which was on Nelly's 2008 gold album Brass Knuckles. He has worked with a number of artists, including Atmosphere, DOOM, Funkadelic, The Game, G Unit, Ice Cube, Pusha T, Rhymesayers, and Rihanna, among others. G Koop also wrote, produced, and played a number of songs with George Clinton on Funkadelic's 2014 First Ya Gotta Shake the Gate. The album, the first for the band in 33 years, provided 33 tracks with a number of artists, including Sly Stone, Soul Clap, and Bootsy Collins. The second single on the album, "Ain’t that Funkin’ Kinda Hard on You," was written and produced by G Koop and George Clinton. Hip Hop producer Ill Tal, in his review, called it "one of the best songs on the album and the name of George’s new auto-biography. The song is smooth, mellow, and funky with George doing most of the vocal leads." Nick DeRiso, in his review of the album for Something Else Reviews, called "Ain’t that Funkin’ Kinda Hard on You" the "perfect reintroduction of George Clinton … since it begins with a darkly ingratiating embrace rather that the expected turn-this-mother-out groove."  DeRiso goes on to call the track the "standout moment from Funkadelic’s sprawling new comeback effort." Other G Koop songs were singled out in reviews as well. Ill Tal wrote of "You Can’t Unring the Bell," that it is "probably my favorite hip-hop influenced song on the album." Ill Tal went on to refer to G Koop (although not by name): "Whoever made the beat did a great job sampling a break beat for the drums and what sounds like an old horn riff from George’s vaults." G Koop's bass playing was also recognized in E.E. Bradman's review for Bass Player, who commended G Koop's bass playing on a number of tracks.

With Metro Boomin, G Koop co-produced the song "Bad and Boujee" by Migos, featuring Lil Uzi Vert—his first no. 1 hit. The song was released in October 2016, and it rose to no. 1 on the Billboard Hot 100 in January 2017. The song has gone platinum in the United States. The album the song appeared on, Migos' Culture, debuted at no. 1 on the Billboard 200. The sample pack used on the song was originally sent to Metro Boomin, and was used to make not only Bad and Boujee, but also 21 Savage's "Ocean Drive."

G Koop worked with producer Southside of 808 Mafia on DJ Khaled's 2016 "I Got the Keys," featuring Jay Z and Future. I Got the Keys has gone platinum, and rose to no. 30 on the Billboard Hot 100. The song is on the album Major Key, produced by Southside and co-produced by G Koop and Jake One as co-producers. The album was released at no. 1 on the Billboard 200, and was nominated for a Grammy for Best Rap Album.

Since then, he has worked with Ant, one of two members of Atmosphere, on Atmosphere's albums Fishing Blues and Southsiders, and in a collaboration with Brother Ali on the latter's album, "All the Beauty in this Whole Life."

G Koop's studio, "Fuzz Deluxxe," is based in Oakland. He also runs the website "Sample Replay Society," which works as a catalog for his work. He collects old instruments, such as the Clavinet and Fender Rhodes, and has several Fender guitars. He is a client of Pulse Recording.

Selected discography

References

External links
 
 
 

American hip hop record producers
East Coast hip hop musicians
Male hip hop musicians
Rappers from Boston
Living people
21st-century American rappers
21st-century American male musicians
Year of birth missing (living people)